A Way Out of the Wilderness is a 1968 American short documentary film produced by Dan E. Weisburd. It was nominated for an Academy Award for Best Documentary Short. The film was preserved by the Academy Film Archive in 2011.

See also
List of American films of 1968

References

External links

Watch A Way Out of the Wilderness at the United States National Library of Medicine

1968 films
1960s short documentary films
1968 short films
1968 documentary films
American short documentary films
1960s English-language films
1960s American films